Brian Sullivan may refer to:
 Brian Sullivan (news anchor) (born 1971), presenter of programs on CNBC
 Brian Sullivan (district attorney) (1966–2014), politician from Tacoma, Washington
 Brian Sullivan (Washington politician, born 1958), politician from Snohomish County, Washington
 Brian Sullivan (game designer), co-founder of Iron Lore Entertainment and founding partner of Ensemble Studios
 Brian Sullivan (ice hockey) (born 1969), retired ice hockey right winger
 Brian Ford Sullivan, American television writer
 Brian P. Sullivan (born 1963), mayor of Westfield, Massachusetts
 Brian Sullivan (singer) (1917–1969), with the Metropolitan Opera, San Francisco Opera, the Lyric Opera of Chicago, and other groups
 Brian Sullivan (New Hampshire politician), member of the New Hampshire House of Representatives
 Brian Sullivan (died 1938), a suspect in the Cheltenham torso mystery
 Brian Sullivan, developer of the Babe Ruth Home Run Award

See also
Brian O'Sullivan (disambiguation)
Ryan Sullivan (disambiguation)